CCGS Tupper was a Canadian Coast Guard ice-strengthened buoy tender that served from 1959 to 1998. The vessel spent her entire career on the East Coast of Canada. Following her Canadian service, Tupper was sold to private interests with the intention of converting her to a yacht, but the conversion never happened and the vessel moved about Halifax Harbour, suffering a fire in 2008 before being sold for scrap in 2011. The vessel was not scrapped and the Canadian Coast Guard was forced to address the pollution concerns of the abandoned vessel in 2021.

Design and description
The vessels were powered by a diesel-electric system driving two screws creating . The ships were fitted with a flight deck and a telescopic hangar and were capable of operating one helicopter.

Service history
The buoy tender's keel was laid down in March 1959 by Marine Industries at their yard in Sorel, Quebec with the yard number 257. Tupper was launched on 3 October 1959, named for a former Prime Minister of Canada. The ship entered service with the Department of Transport on 1 December 1959. In 1962 the Department of Transport's Marine Service fleet was merged into the newly formed Canadian Coast Guard and Tupper was given the new prefix CCGS.

Tupper was active in servicing the navigation aids of Atlantic Canada as well as operating in heavy ice conditions in the Gulf of St. Lawrence and St. Lawrence River, and also acted as a harbour cleanup vessel. She occasionally traveled to the north. Earlier in her career she was stationed in Charlottetown, Prince Edward Island.

Fate
The ship was taken out of service in 1997 and used as alongside training ship at CCG Dartmouth Base, renamed 1998-05 until 1999 when she was sold to an American interest and renamed MV Caruso intended for conversion to a yacht. The vessel changed owners a couple of times, never leaving Halifax Harbour, changing piers until 11 October 2008 when a large fire broke out aboard Caruso while she was moored, requiring the services of the Royal Canadian Navy's firefighting tugboat . The blaze was deemed suspicious and partially gutted the vessel. In 2011 the hulk was sold for scrap to be broken up in Marie Joseph, a small community in the Eastern Shore region of Nova Scotia. The vessel's dismantling was never completed and the hulk became a point of much controversy and concern. In January 2021, the Canadian Coast Guard's Environmental Response branch was sent to Marie Joseph to deal with the hulk and the remains of the former tugboat Craig Trans which lay beside it. They removed roughly  fuel oil/water from the hulks. In 2022 it was announced R.J. MacIsaac Construction were to remove and green recycle the remnants of the vessel. Dismantling is scheduled to start at the end of January 2023.

Notes

Citations

Sources
 
 
 
 

Canadian Government Ship
Navaids tenders of the Canadian Coast Guard
1959 ships
Ships built in Quebec
Ships of the Canadian Coast Guard